Dylan Scott Robinson (born October 22, 1990) is an American country pop singer and songwriter, better known by his stage name Dylan Scott. He is signed to Curb Records.

Career
Scott's debut single, "Makin' This Boy Go Crazy", was released in June 2013. Billy Dukes of Taste of Country gave the song three and a half stars out of five, writing that "the native Louisianan can really rumble when he reaches down to hit the low notes, but his performance won't leave female fans tingling like the greats." It charted for 10 weeks on the Billboard Country Airplay chart, peaking at number 54 in April 2014. The song's music video premiered on CMT in December 2013.

Scott's second single, "Mmm, Mmm, Mmm", was released in July 2014. Markos Papadatos of Digital Journal gave the song a B+ rating, writing that "the song has a Jake Owen meets Colt Ford vibe to it, especially since he displays his smooth baritone and rap vocals."

Both songs are included on his extended play, Makin' This Boy Go Crazy (also as the self-titled  Dylan Scott EP), which was released on February 11, 2014. The EP was produced by Jim Ed Norman. It peaked at number 50 on the Billboard Top Country Albums chart. Another single, "Lay It on Me", came out in late 2014.

Dylan Scott had his first number one record in the summer of 2016 with "My Girl", a song written for his high school sweetheart-now wife, Blair Robinson.  "My Girl" is also Scott's first Platinum record, indicating the single has sold  1,000,000 copies.

Scott released his debut studio album, self-titled Dylan Scott, in August 2016. It debuted at number five on the Top Country Albums chart, selling 9,000 copies for the week.

Scott followed up "My Girl" with a number 2 record, "Hooked", from his Dylan Scott album, which was later certified Gold.

Scott released the single "Nothing to Do Town", which was accompanied by a music video and released on December 17, 2018.

In 2019, Scott released an EP titled An Old Memory, containing seven covers of Keith Whitley songs and features a guest appearance from Whitley's widow Lorrie Morgan.

Personal life 
Scott was born in Louisiana and moved to Nashville at the age of 19.

Scott and his wife, Blair Robinson live in Nashville with their two children, son Beckett Scott (born December 12, 2017) and daughter Finley Gray (born August 28, 2019).

Discography

Studio albums

Extended plays

Singles

Other charted songs

Music videos

References

External links

1990 births
American country singer-songwriters
American male singer-songwriters
Country musicians from Louisiana
Living people
People from Bastrop, Louisiana
Curb Records artists
Singer-songwriters from Louisiana
21st-century American singers
21st-century American male singers